Sadrabad (also Romanized as Şadrābād; also known as Şadrābād Pā’īn) is a village in Rostaq Rural District, in the Central District of Saduq County, Yazd Province, Iran. At the 2006 census, its population was 1,282, in 357 families.

References 

Populated places in Saduq County